Austin Charles Bryan Hays (born July 5, 1995) is an American professional baseball outfielder for the Baltimore Orioles of Major League Baseball (MLB). He made his MLB debut in 2017.

Amateur career
Hays attended Spruce Creek High School in Port Orange, Florida. He attended Seminole State College of Florida, where he played college baseball for the Seminole State Raiders, and transferred to Jacksonville University, where he continued his college baseball career with the Jacksonville Dolphins. In 2015, he played collegiate summer baseball with the Hyannis Harbor Hawks of the Cape Cod Baseball League.

Professional career
The Baltimore Orioles selected Hays in the third round of the 2016 Major League Baseball draft. Hays signed and made his professional debut with the Aberdeen Ironbirds of the Class A-Short Season New York-Penn League where he batted .336 with four home runs and 21 RBIs in 38 games. He started the 2017 season with the Frederick Keys of the Class A-Advanced Carolina League. On May 26, 2017, he became the first player in Frederick history to hit three home runs in one game. He received a promotion to the Bowie Baysox of the Class AA Eastern League in June 2017. In 128 games between Frederick and Bowie, he slashed .329/.365/.593 with 32 home runs and 95 RBIs.

The Orioles promoted Hays to the major leagues on September 5, 2017, making him the first 2016 draftee to reach the major leagues. He made his major league debut September 7, 2017. He had his first MLB hit, followed by his first MLB home run, in a 9–3 loss against the New York Yankees on September 16. In 20 games for Baltimore during the 2017 season, he batted .217/.238/.317 in 60 at bats. He began 2018 with Bowie. He did not play in the majors in 2018 struggling with under performance and injury.

Hays was recalled by the Orioles from the Triple-A Norfolk Tides on September 7, 2019. He was supposed to have reported to the Surprise Saguaros on September 11, the first time ever that the Arizona Fall League (AFL) season opened before October. His promotion was made possible by both MLB and the Major League Baseball Players Association (MLBPA) which, two days prior to the transaction, approved a rule change that allowed players on the 40-man roster to report to the AFL in October. In a 15-inning 11–10 loss to the Toronto Blue Jays at Rogers Centre on September 23, he became the first MLB rookie to have at least five RBIs, a stolen base and an outfield assist in the same game since the RBI became an official stat in 1920. The Orioles eventually decided not to send him to the Saguaros after he started in 15 of 20 games, batted .313 with a .958 OPS and made several spectacular defensive plays. On August 11, 2020, Hays hit a two-run inside-the-park home run against the Philadelphia Phillies to break an 8-8 tie. That would be the game's difference maker as the Orioles won the game in extra innings, 10-9.

In 2020 for the Orioles, Hays slashed .279/.328/.393 with four home runs and nine RBIs; in 2021, he appeared in 131 games with Baltimore, batting .256 with 22 home runs and 71 RBIs.

Hays returned to the Orioles for the 2022 season. On June 22, he hit for the cycle in a game against the Washington Nationals.

On January 13, 2023, Hays agreed to a one-year, $3.2 million contract with the Orioles, avoiding salary arbitration.

Personal life
Hays and his wife Samantha have two sons together.

References

External links

1995 births
Living people
Sportspeople from Daytona Beach, Florida
Baseball players from Florida
Major League Baseball outfielders
Baltimore Orioles players
Seminole State Raiders baseball players
Jacksonville Dolphins baseball players
Aberdeen IronBirds players
Frederick Keys players
Bowie Baysox players
Norfolk Tides players
Hyannis Harbor Hawks players